Eravimala (ഇരവിമല) is  the highest peak located in the Anamalai Hills in the Western Ghats, India. It is the tenth highest peak in South India.

Other prominent peaks  (more than 2,000m) in the Idukki district are:
Anamala 
 Devimala
Karimkulam
Devicolam
Kumarikkal
Kattumala
Perumal
Ghudoor
Sabarimala
Kabula
Karimala
Anchanad
Chentavara

References

Mountains of Kerala
Geography of Idukki district
Mountains of the Western Ghats
Two-thousanders of Asia